Wish You Were Here is a novel by English writer Graham Swift, first published in 2011.

Synopsis
This is a novel about the changing face of rural England. It is narrated by the last of a long line of West Country farmers who now (in 2004) runs a caravan park on the Isle of Wight with his childhood sweetheart, the daughter of a neighbouring farmer. As Jack Luxton travels to collect the body of his brother, repatriated from the war in Iraq, and take it to the family burial plot in North Devon, he relates the history of the Luxton family and their traditional professions of farming and military service. Alongside this he tells the story of the near demise of dairy farming in England, through the twin catastrophes of BSE in 1996 and the foot and mouth disease in 2001. Added to this is the increasingly common and equally disastrous disease of wealthy city dwellers buying second homes in rural areas, thus disrupting traditional village life and making it too expensive for locals to stay in their natural communities.

References

External links
Review in the Telegraph
Review in the Washington Post

2011 British novels
Novels by Graham Swift
Novels set in Devon
Picador (imprint) books
Culture on the Isle of Wight
Novels about families
Fiction set in 2004